The Lakshadweep football team is an Indian football team which represents the union territory of Lakshadweep, India. The team participates in Indian state football competitions including the Santosh Trophy (since the 2016–17 edition).

History
During the All India Football Federation general body meeting on 21 December 2016, it was confirmed that the Lakshadweep Football Association would gain affiliation with India's national football association. After gaining affiliation, the federation began preparations for the 2016–17 Santosh Trophy qualifiers. Majority of the players come from the local Kavaratti League. Their first match occurred on 6 January 2017 when Lakshadweep took on Tamil Nadu. Despite being resilient in defense, Lakshadweep succumbed to a 2–0 defeat. Four days later, on 10 January, Lakshadweep made history by earning their first ever victory in the Santosh Trophy, a 1–0 victory over Telangana. K.P. Ummer was the goalscorer for Lakshadweep.

Despite not qualifying the previous tournament, Lakshadweep returned for the 2017–18 qualifiers. In their first match against Madhya Pradesh the side won 5–0.

Statistics and records

Season-by-season

Head Coaches record

See also
 Santosh Trophy

References

External links

Football in Lakshadweep
Santosh Trophy teams
2017 establishments in Lakshadweep
Association football clubs established in 2017